Pablo Ariel Santillo (born 7 March 1980) is an Argentine professional footballer who plays as a goalkeeper for Argentine Primera División side Arsenal de Sarandí.

Career
Santillo's career began in 2001 with Argentine Primera División team Chacarita Juniors, where he remained until 2003 when he joined lower-league Atlanta. Two years later, Santillo left to join Primera División club Banfield. He stayed with Banfield for eight years between 2005 and 2013, his spell there included two loan spells. His first loan was to Ecuadorian Serie A side Barcelona while his second was to top-flight Argentine team Racing Club, he made just two appearances for the latter before returning to Banfield. In 2013, after thirty-one appearances in Primera B Nacional, Santillo left to sign for fellow tier two club Talleres.

A secondary spell with Atlanta (in Primera B Metropolitana) before moves to Defensa y Justicia and Arsenal de Sarandí have since followed.

Career statistics
.

Honours
Banfield
Argentine Primera División: 2009–10 Apertura

References

External links

1980 births
Living people
Footballers from Buenos Aires
Argentine footballers
Association football goalkeepers
Primera B Metropolitana players
Primera Nacional players
Argentine Primera División players
Chacarita Juniors footballers
Club Atlético Atlanta footballers
Club Atlético Banfield footballers
Barcelona S.C. footballers
Racing Club de Avellaneda footballers
Talleres de Córdoba footballers
Defensa y Justicia footballers
Arsenal de Sarandí footballers